Gur-e Espid (also Romanized as Gūr-e Espīd and Gūr Espīd; also known as Gūr-e Sefīd) is a village in Mahur Rural District, Mahvarmilani District, Mamasani County, Fars Province, Iran. At the 2006 census, its population was 218, in 41 families.

References 

Populated places in Mamasani County